Chakir Boujattaoui (born 16 January 1983 in Nador) is a Moroccan is a long distance runner who specialises in cross country running, and the 5000 metres and steeplechase on the track.

He won his first medal at the 2009 Mediterranean Games, taking the silver in the 5000 m. At the 2009 World Championships in Athletics, he finished eleventh, before finishing his year with the 5000 m gold and the 3000 m steeplechase silver at the 2009 Jeux de la Francophonie. Boujattaoui has competed at the IAAF World Cross Country Championships and finished eighth at the 2009 race and twelfth in 2010. He was disqualified from the 2010 event after failing a test for the banned substance MIRCERA and he was suspended from competition for two years.

Career
A late comer to professional athletics, Boujattaoui began to compete internationally in 2008. His first major competition was the 2008 IAAF World Cross Country Championships, where he finished in 40th place. The following year he had much improved and finished in eighth place at the 2009 IAAF World Cross Country Championships, leading the Moroccan men's team to sixth place in the rankings. He then represented his country at the 2009 Mediterranean Games and he recorded a personal best of 8:13.83 minutes in the 3000 metres steeplechase for the silver medal. He was beaten to the gold by teammate Jamel Chatbi, who failed a drugs test two months later (testing positive for clenbuterol).

Boujattaoui recorded a new 5000 metres personal best of 13:09.62 at the Golden Gala a week later, and he was selected to represent Morocco at the 2009 World Championships in Athletics. He made it to the 5000 metres final of the World Championships and finished in eleventh position, beating more experienced compatriot Anis Selmouni. He closed the year with a performance at the 2009 Jeux de la Francophonie where he claimed the silver in the steeplechase, before going on to win the gold medal in the 5000 m.

At the 2010 IAAF World Cross Country Championships, he finished in twelfth position (again leading the Moroccan team which finished fourth on this occasion). However, his performance did not stand as he failed a pre-competition drugs test for MIRCERA (an variant on the banned blood booster EPO). He was banned from competition for two years, with the suspension lasting until May 2012. His disqualification also meant Morocco were moved to fifth in the team rankings at the World Cross Country Championships.

Personal bests

All information taken from IAAF profile.

Competition record

See also
List of doping cases in athletics

References

External links

1983 births
Living people
Moroccan male long-distance runners
Doping cases in athletics
Moroccan sportspeople in doping cases
Moroccan male steeplechase runners
Mediterranean Games silver medalists for Morocco
Athletes (track and field) at the 2009 Mediterranean Games
Moroccan male cross country runners
Mediterranean Games medalists in athletics